"Ooh-Wakka-Doo-Wakka-Day" is a 1972 song by Gilbert O'Sullivan. The song became a top ten hit in the UK, peaking at #8 on the UK Singles Chart, spending a total of 11 weeks on the chart.  It was also the first of three (consecutive) #1s on the Irish Singles Chart for O'Sullivan.

The song was never released on a studio album, but in 2012 it was added to a remastered version of Back to Front.

In 2013, a single-purpose version of the song which featured 300 people singing a reworded version of the song whilst going about their daily lives was used for an advert for the National Lottery.

References

1972 singles
Gilbert O'Sullivan songs
1972 songs
Songs written by Gilbert O'Sullivan
MAM Records singles